The Scottish Daily Newspaper Society (SDNS) was the trade body representing the major daily newspaper publishers of Scotland. Representing a total of 18 titles, together they accounted for aggregate weekly sales of 10 million in 2008.

Established in 1915, the Society was based in Edinburgh.

In 2009, the Scottish Daily Newspaper Society amalgamated with the Scottish Newspaper Publishers Association, a similar trade body for weekly and biweekly newspapers, to form the Scottish Newspaper Society.

Member companies
Aberdeen Journals
Associated Newspapers
DC Thomson & Co Ltd
News International Newspapers (Scotland) Ltd
Newsquest (Herald & Times) Ltd
Scottish Daily Record & Sunday Mail Ltd
The Scotsman Publications Ltd

See also
 List of newspapers in Scotland

References

External links
 Scottish Daily Newspaper Society hopeful over more 2012 Olympics accreditation for Scots newspapers, The Drum, 1 August 2011

Organisations based in Edinburgh
Newspaper associations
Industry trade groups based in Scotland
Newspapers published in Scotland